Jean K. Chalaby is a sociologist who specializes in global media, transnational television (including channels and formats), comparative media studies, and media history. Since the year 2000 Chalaby has been working as a researcher and senior lecturer in the Department of Sociology at City University in London.

Publications

Books

(2009) Transnational Television in Europe: Reconfiguring Global Communications Networks. London: I.B. Tauris.
(2002) The de Gaulle Presidency and the Media: Statism and Public Communications, Basingstoke: Palgrave Macmillan
(1998) The Invention of Journalism, Basingstoke: Macmillan; New York: St Martin Press
Edited collection
(2005) Transnational Television Worldwide: Towards a New Media Order, London: I.B. Tauris

Book chapters

(2007) ‘Journalism and the Two Industrial Revolutions of the Twentieth Century’, in M. Broersma (ed.) Form and Style in Journalism: European Newspapers and the Representation of News, 1880–2005, pp. 235–243. Leuven: Peeters
(2007) ‘One Nation, One State, One Television: Making Sense of de Gaulle’s Broadcasting Policy’, in J. Wardhaugh (ed.) Paris and the Right in the Twentieth Century, pp. 86–103. Newcastle: Cambridge Scholars Publishing
(2006) ‘Television for a New Global Order: Transnational Television Networks and the Formation of Global Systems’ [in Mandarin], pp. 272–291 in S. Sun (ed.) Global Media Policies: New Perspectives. Shanghai: Shanghai Joint Press
(2005) ‘Introduction: Towards an Understanding of Media Transnationalism’, pp. 1–13 in J. Chalaby (ed.) Transnational Television Worldwide London: I.B. Tauris
(2005) ‘The Quiet Invention of a New Medium: Twenty Years of Transnational Television in Europe’, pp. 43–65 in J. Chalaby (ed.) Transnational Television Worldwide London: I.B. Tauris
(2004) ‘L’adaptation des programmes européens aux marchés nationaux : L’exemple d’Eurosport en Grande-Bretagne’ [‘The Adaptation of European programming to national markets: The case of Eurosport in Great Britain’], pp. 231–241 in D. Marchetti (ed.) En quête d’Europe : Médias européens et médiatisation de l’Europe Rennes: Presses Universitaires de Rennes
(2003) ‘Transnational television in Europe: Affluence without influence’, pp. 13–30 in M. Bond (ed.) Europe, Parliament and the Media London: The Federal Trust for Education and Research
(2000) ‘Northcliffe: Proprietor as Journalist’, pp. 25–41 in P. Catterall, C. Seymour-Ure and A. Smith (eds) Northcliffe's Legacy: Apects of the British Press, 1896-1996 Basingstoke: Macmillan; New York: St Martin Press; London: Institute of Contemporary British History

External links
 City University, London: http://www.city.ac.uk/sociology/staffdetails/Chalaby.html

Swiss sociologists
Living people
Year of birth missing (living people)